Andrew Bruce may refer to:

Andrew Bruce (athlete) (born 1958), athlete from Trinidad and Tobago
Andrew Davis Bruce (1894–1969), former Major General and President of the University of Houston
Andy Bruce (born 1964), Scottish former professional football player
Andrew A. Bruce (1866–1934), North Dakota Supreme Court justice
Andrew Bruce (bishop) (1630–1699), Scottish bishop
Andrew Bruce, 11th Earl of Elgin (born 1924), Scottish nobleman